Kosmos 221 ( meaning Cosmos 221), also known as DS-P1-Yu No.14, was a Soviet satellite which was used as a radar calibration target for tests of anti-ballistic missiles. It was built by the Yuzhnoye Design Bureau, and launched in 1968 as part of the Dnepropetrovsk Sputnik programme.

Kosmos 221 was launched from Site 86/4 at Kapustin Yar, atop a Kosmos-2I 63SM carrier rocket. The launch occurred on 24 May 1968 at 07:04:50 GMT, and resulted in Kosmos 221's successful deployment into low Earth orbit. Upon reaching orbit, it was assigned its Kosmos designation, and received the International Designator 1968-043A.

It remained in orbit until it decayed and reentered the atmosphere on 31 August 1969. It was the thirteenth of seventy nine DS-P1-Yu satellites to be launched, and the twelfth of seventy two to successfully reach orbit.

See also

1968 in spaceflight

References

Spacecraft launched in 1968
Kosmos satellites
Dnepropetrovsk Sputnik program